The Enemies of Books is a book on biblioclasts and book preservation by the 19th-century bibliophile and book collector William Blades. The book was first published in 1880 and has been republished in different editions in 1881, 1888, 1896, and 1902 and reproduced widely in electronic format in the 21st century. In the book, Blades, a well-known collector and preserver of the works of the English printer William Caxton, documented his outrage at any mistreatment of books in what became a passionate diatribe against biblioclasts, human and non-human, wherever he found them.

The book includes chapters on the following enemies of books: fire, water, gas and heat, dust and neglect, ignorance and bigotry, the bookworm, bookbinders, book collectors, other vermin (such as rats or flies), servants, and children. The book ends with a passionate call for reverence for old books, something he felt was lacking during his life.

See also 
 Destruction of libraries

Notes

External links
 D. J. McAdam e text of The Enemies of Books
 E-text at the University of Virginia
 Project Gutenberg E-text
 

1880 non-fiction books
English non-fiction books
Preservation (library and archival science)